Zackarias Faour (born 30 January 1998) is a Swedish professional footballer who plays as a forward for Swedish club Assyriska IK. Born in Sweden, Faour is of Lebanese descent.

Club career
Faour was a youth player for Manchester City.

References

External links
 

1998 births
Living people
Footballers from Malmö
Swedish footballers
Swedish people of Lebanese descent
Sportspeople of Lebanese descent
Association football forwards
Malmö FF players
Manchester City F.C. players
FC Midtjylland players
FC Nordsjælland players
IK Sirius Fotboll players
Östers IF players
Oskarshamns AIK players
Leixões S.C. players
Assyriska IK players
Allsvenskan players
Superettan players
Ettan Fotboll players
Sweden youth international footballers
Swedish expatriate footballers
Swedish expatriate sportspeople in Denmark
Expatriate footballers in Portugal